Aeromicrobium erythreum is a bacterium from the genus Aeromicrobium which has been isolated from soil from Puerto Rico. Aeromicrobium erythreum produces erythromycin.

References

Further reading 
 
 
 

Propionibacteriales
Bacteria described in 1991